The American League Central is one of Major League Baseball's six divisions. This division was formed in the realignment of 1994 by moving three teams from the American League West and two teams from the American League East. Its teams are all located in the Midwestern United States. Along with the National League East, the AL Central is one of two divisions in the Major Leagues in which all of its members have won a World Series title. In fact, each team has captured at least two World Series championships. The Kansas City Royals were the most recent team from the division to win the World Series.

Division membership

Current members
Chicago White Sox – Founding member; formerly of the AL West
Cleveland Guardians – Founding member; formerly of the AL East; known as the Cleveland Indians until 2021
Detroit Tigers – Joined in 1998; formerly of the AL East
Kansas City Royals – Founding member; formerly of the AL West
Minnesota Twins – Founding member; formerly of the AL West

Former member
Milwaukee Brewers – Founding member, moved into the NL Central in 1998

Membership timeline
 Place cursor over year for division champ or World Series team.
 

 The Chicago White Sox, Kansas City Royals, and Minnesota Twins came from the AL West, and the Cleveland Indians and Milwaukee Brewers from the AL East.
 The Cleveland Guardians were known as the Cleveland Indians until November 2021.
 Due to expansion in 1998 and the placement of the new Tampa Bay Devil Rays in the AL East, the Tigers moved to the Central. To give each league an even number of teams, the Brewers moved to the NL Central.

Champions by year
The Chicago White Sox and Kansas City Royals are the only teams from the AL Central division to have won the World Series since the league realignment in 1994.

Team names link to the season in which each team played

* Due to the 1994 Major League Baseball strike starting August 12, no winner was determined. The Chicago White Sox were leading at the time that the strike began.

**  In , the Minnesota Twins and Chicago White Sox finished the season with the identical records of 88–74. The White Sox won the one-game playoff 1–0.

# In , the Minnesota Twins and Detroit Tigers finished the season with identical records of 86–76. The Twins won the one-game playoff 6–5 in 12 innings.

*** Due to the COVID-19 pandemic, the season was shortened to 60 games. By virtue of the eight-team postseason format used for that season, division runner-up Cleveland (35–25, .583) also qualified for the playoffs. The Indians were tied with the Chicago White Sox but won the runner-up honors with a better head-to-head record (Indians won the season series 8–2 over the White Sox).

Other postseason teams

In 1994, the Cleveland Indians were sitting atop the wild-card standings and would have qualified for the postseason as the AL's first wild card but on August 12 of that year, the season came to an early end due to a players strike, cancelling the remainder of the regular season and postseason. The 2006 Detroit Tigers were the first team from the Central to qualify as the wild card. MLB revamped the postseason starting in 2012, creating a new single-game playoff where two wildcards competed against each other while the division winners each received a bye. The winner of the American League wild card game moves on to face the top-seeded team of the AL in the American League Division Series. In 2013, the Indians became the first team from the AL Central to qualify as a wild card under the new postseason format. In 2014, the Kansas City Royals ended a 29-year postseason drought returning to the playoffs for the first time since winning the World Series in 1985.

In 2020 only, eight teams, including the three division winners, played in a best-of-three Wild Card Series, with the winners advancing to the Division Series. Starting in 2022, the Wild Card field was increased to three teams, and along with the lowest-ranked division winner, qualified for the Wild Card Series to determine the remaining two slots in the Division Series.

† – Due to the COVID-19 pandemic, the season was shortened to 60 games. The White Sox were tied with the Cleveland Indians but lost the runner-up honors due to an inferior head-to-head record (White Sox lost the season series 2–8 over the Indians).

Season results

Notes and Tiebreakers
 Minnesota and Anaheim of the American League West were tied for the second and third seed, but the Twins were relegated to the third seed by losing the season series 5–4.
 Cleveland and Boston of the American League East were tied for the first and second seed, but the Indians were relegated to the second seed by losing the season series 5–2.
 Chicago and Minnesota were tied for the division championship and played in a tie-breaker game. The White Sox won 1–0 to claim the division crown.
 Minnesota and Detroit were tied for the division championship and played in a tie-breaker game. The Twins won 6–5 in 12 innings to claim the second wild-card spot.
 Cleveland and Chicago were tied for the fourth and seventh seed, but the Indians claimed the fourth seed by winning the season series 8–2.

Division championships won by team

Current division members in bold

See also
American League East
American League West
National League East
National League Central
National League West

References
MLB final standings by year

Major League Baseball divisions
1994 establishments in the United States